The following is a list of Mayors of Pärnu, Estonia.

Mayors
1879–1915, 1918, Oscar Alexander Brackmann (1841–1927)
1917–1918, Jaan Leesment (1870–1941)
1918, Oscar Alexander Brackmann (1841–1927)
1918–1919, Hugo Kuusner (1887–1942)
1920–1921, Jaan Timusk (1886–1957)
1921–1924,   Hendrik Soo (1879–1939)
1924–1936, Oskar Kask (1898–1942)
1936–1939,   Hendrik Soo (1879–1939)
1939–1940, Priit Suve (1901–1942)
28 July 1940–, Robert Terase, acting
1941 Vladimir Saar, Pärnu Linna TSN Täitevkomitee esimees
1941 Jaak Nessler, Pärnu Linna TSN Täitevkomitee esimees 
1941–1942, Arthur Peetre (1907–1989)
1942–1944, Voldemar Ernesaks (1903–1989)
1944–1946, Jaak Nessler
1946–1953, Villem Lombak]]
1953–1957, Eduard Mettus]]
1957–1959, Elmar Hallmägi
1959–1962, Vladimir Makarov
1962–1965, Valter Hallmägi
1965–1974, Vladimir Makarov
1974–1982, Henn Lõmps
1982–1987, Mihhail Trofimov
1987–1989, Valeri Dejev
1989–1992, Jaak Saarniit
1992–1995, Rein Kask
1995–1996, Väino Linde
1996–1999, Vello Järvesalu
1999–2000, Andres Sooniste
2000–2002, Einar Kelder
2002–2005, Väino Hallikmägi
28 April 2005 – 1 November 2005 Ahti Kõo
1 November 2005 – 19 November 2009 Mart Viisitamm
19 November 2009 – 30 March 2015 Toomas Kivimägi
30 March 2015 – 16 April 2015 Jane Mets, deputy
16 April 2015 – Romek Kosenkranius

References

 List of mayors of Pärnu
Pärnu